The IPSC Australian Shotgun Championship is an IPSC level 3 championship held once a year by IPSC Australia.

Champions 
The following is a list of current and previous champions.

Overall category

Senior category

Super Senior category

See also 
IPSC Australian Handgun Championship
IPSC Australian Rifle Championship

References 

Match Results - 2009 IPSC Australian Shotgun Championship
Match Results - 2010 IPSC Australian Shotgun Championship
Match Results - 2011 IPSC Australian Shotgun Championship
Match Results - 2013 IPSC Australian Shotgun Championship

IPSC shooting competitions
National championships in Australia
Shooting competitions in Australia
Shotgun shooting sports